William Kenneth Armitage  (18 July 1916 – 22 January 2002) was a British sculptor known for his semi-abstract bronzes.

Life
Armitage was born in Leeds on July 18, 1916, the youngest of three children studied at the Leeds College of Art and the Slade School of Fine Art in London before joining the British Army (Royal Artillery) in 1939.

In 1940 he married Joan Moore, another sculptor. They separated in the 1950s but never divorced. They had no children.

After leaving the army, Armitage became head of the sculpture department at the Bath Academy of Art in 1946. In 1952, he held his first one-man show in London. In 1953, he became Great Britain's first university artist in residence, at the University of Leeds (to 1956).  In 1958, he won best international sculpture under age 45 at the Venice Biennale. Armitage was made CBE in 1969 and was elected to the Royal Academy in 1994. In 2001, his sculpture "Both Arms" was erected along with a blue plaque in Millennium Square, Leeds, being unveiled by Nelson Mandela. His 2001 sculpture "Legs walking" was erected in City Square, Leeds outside Mill Hill Chapel in 2018.

He died 22 January 2002.

Work
Armitage's striking mature style was evident as early as 1952. Most of his works are recognizably human, but are sometimes joined with the forms of animals or furniture. Many displayed quirky humor. Armitage was also interested in ancient Egyptian and Cycladic art and his works have an archaic flavour. He was featured in the 1964 documentary film "5 British Sculptors (Work and Talk)" by American filmmaker Warren Forma. During the 1960s and beyond, Armitage adapted to the styles of the times, sometimes incorporating plastic or spray paint.

Exhibition
 1960: Kenneth Armitage - Lynn Chadwick, Kestner-Gesellschaft, Hannover, Germany
 1963: Kenneth Armitage - Galerie Charles Lienhard, Zurich, Switzerland

References

 "Armitage, Kenneth",Encyclopædia Britannica, 2008, Encyclopædia Britannica Online. November 26, 2008.
 Ratcliff, Carter. "Armitage, Kenneth", Academic American Encyclopedia, 1991 edition, volume 2, pp. 173–174.
 Schmalenbach, Werner: Catalogue covering the exhibition of 1960 at Kestner-Gesellschaft, Hannover (in German).

External links

 
 
 Works at the Tate

1916 births
2002 deaths
Geometry of Fear
Alumni of Leeds Arts University
Alumni of the Slade School of Fine Art
20th-century British sculptors
British male sculptors
Commanders of the Order of the British Empire
Royal Academicians
Leeds Blue Plaques
British Army personnel of World War II
Royal Artillery soldiers
20th-century British male artists